is a retired Japanese judoka.

Saito is from Sapporo, Hokkaidō. He belonged to Asahi Kasei after graduation from Kokushikan University in 2000.

Saito was good at Uchimata and Newaza in high-school days and was expected to get medal of Olympic Games or World Championships in the future. But he was not able to use the skill of them by the trouble of knee like Anterior cruciate ligament injury since 2000.

In 2005, he won a gold medal at the Asian Championships and All-Japan Selected Championships with the skill that he learned newly like Kata guruma, Ōuchi gari and Kuchiki taoshi. But he was not chosen as a Japanese representative at the World Championships held in Cairo.

He has coached judo at Asahi Kasei since 2010. Among his students is Tatsuki Masubuchi
Yohei Takai and so on.

His younger brother,  is also famous judoka and won a gold medal at the Kodokan Cup in 2001.

Achievements
1994 - All-Japan Junior Championships (-86 kg) 2nd
 - Inter-highschool championships (-86 kg) 3rd
1995 - Kodokan Cup (-86 kg) 2nd
 - Inter-highschool championships (-86 kg) 1st
1996 - Jigoro Kano Cup (-86 kg) 3rd
 - All-Japan Selected Championships (-86 kg) 3rd
 - All-Japan Junior Championships (-86 kg) 1st
1997 - Kodokan Cup (-90 kg) 2nd
 - All-Japan Junior Championships (-86 kg) 1st
 - All-Japan University Championships (-86 kg) 3rd
1998 - All-Japan University Championships (-90 kg) 3rd
1999 - Kodokan Cup (-90 kg) 3rd
 - All-Japan University Championships (-90 kg) 2nd
2000 - All-Japan Businessgroup Championships (-90 kg) 2nd
2001 - All-Japan Selected Championships (-90 kg) 2nd
 - Kodokan Cup (-90 kg) 1st
2002 - All-Japan Selected Championships (-90 kg) 3rd
 - All-Japan Businessgroup Championships (-90 kg) 1st
2003 - Kodokan Cup (-90 kg) 2nd
 - All-Japan Businessgroup Championships (-90 kg) 1st
2004 - Kodokan Cup (-90 kg) 1st
 - All-Japan Businessgroup Championships (-90 kg) 1st
2005 - Asian Championships (-90 kg) 1st
 - All-Japan Selected Championships (-90 kg) 2nd
 - Kodokan Cup (-90 kg) 1st
2006 - All-Japan Selected Championships (-90 kg) 1st
 - Kodokan Cup (-90 kg) 1st
2007 - Jigoro Kano (-90 kg) 3rd
 - All-Japan Selected Championships (-90 kg) 2nd
 - Kodokan Cup (-90 kg) 1st
2008 - All-Japan Businessgroup Championships (-90 kg) 2nd
2009 - All-Japan Businessgroup Championships (-90 kg) 2nd

References 

Japanese male judoka
Sportspeople from Sapporo
1977 births
Living people
21st-century Japanese people